XPW Arena may refer to:

 Venues used by Xtreme Pro Wrestling
 Reseda Country Club in Reseda, CA in 1999
 2300 Arena in Philadelphia, PA from 2002 to 2003